The Ahuriri Branch, now named the Napier Port Branch, is a 2 km railway branch line off the Palmerston North–Gisborne Line, in Napier, New Zealand. The branch serves the Port of Napier.

Ahuriri by the Inner Harbour, originally called Spit, was the original port of Napier, and a 3 km line from Napier was opened on 25 November 1874, just a month after the opening of the line to Hastings. Passenger services were run on the line until 1908. The 1931 Hawke's Bay earthquake uplifted the area by about 2.5 metres, and the port was transferred to Breakwater, northeast of Bluff Hill. The Napier Harbour Board built a 2.4 km line from Ahuriri to Breakwater, which they operated with two Fowler 0-4-0 tank engines. This line was transferred to the NZR in 1957.

With the redevelopment of the Napier Railway Station in 1989-91 most of the Napier railways facilities were transferred to Pandora Point at the beginning of the Port Branch and the old stockyard at the end of the branch closed. Pandora Point now has a marshalling yard, freight terminal, locomotive depot, and a triangle giving direct access north and south from the port branch. The old main line north to Gisborne was realigned to the east to allow a new link road to the Tamatea area of Napier, and railways land redeveloped as an industrial subdivision.

See also
Palmerston North–Gisborne Line
Moutohora Branch
Nagtapa Branch

References

Further reading 

 
 Hermann, Bruce J; North Island Branch Lines pp 60,61 (2007, New Zealand Railway & Locomotive Society, Wellington)  
It’s all change at Napier; Rails, October 1990, Volume 20 No 3 pp. 52–54 

Railway lines in New Zealand
Railway lines opened in 1874
Rail transport in the Hawke's Bay Region